Ust-Kurya is a rural locality (a settlement) in Korotoyaksky Selsoviet, Khabarsky District, Altai Krai, Russia. The population was 157 as of 2013. It was founded in 1876. There are 3 streets.

Geography 
Ust-Kurya is located 16 km east of Khabary (the district's administrative centre) by road. Kalinovka is the nearest rural locality.

References 

Rural localities in Khabarsky District